Antonio Amorosi (1660 – 5 October 1738) was an Italian painter of the late-Baroque, active in Ascoli Piceno and Rome. Amorosi was born in Comunanza, then part of the Papal States. In 1668, he moved to Rome where he was trained by Giuseppe Ghezzi. He painted genre scenes similar to those of the Bamboccianti.

Biography

He was born in Comunanza in 1660 and moved to Rome in 1668 with the intention to become a priest, his interest in art and, in 1676, acquaintance with Giuseppe Ghezzi, made him change his mind and enter Giuseppe Ghezzi`s  workshop to remain there for 11 years. Around 1690 he became an independent painter. His first work, signed and dated 1690, was the Portrait of the child Filippo Ricci, now kept in the Weitzner private collection in New York.

In 1699 he frescoed the Palazzo comunale of Civitavecchia with Pope Innocent III receiving the Magistrates of the city and with the Madonna and San Fermo, destroyed in 1944; in 1702 he painted, in the church of Santa Maria della Morte in Civitavecchia, the altarpiece Saint Gregorio and the souls of Purgatory.

In the mid-seventeenth century appeared the first bambocciate, that is pictorial representations of scenes of popular life that took their roots in the pictorial culture of northern Europe9genre scenes). In Italy they were marked by grotesque elements and caricatures as it was the representation of life of the "popolino" shown to the aristocratic clientele.

It is said that Amorosi`s interest in genre scenes was fostered by artistic preferences of circle of the Spanish ambassador in Rome, the duke of Uceda, who was himself an important commissioner of Amorosi. In this environment, among other things, Amorosi met and became friends with his future biographer and art historian Leone Pascoli. His popular scenes remained a fundamental component of his artistic activity until his death, granting him commissions from wealthy clients, most belonging to the Roman aristocracy.

In addition to genre scenes, he painted sacred themes, such as can be found in altarpieces in Rome.

According to Pascoli, Amorosi was also a skilled copyist of Renaissance artists and a restorer. His son Filippo also collaborated in his father's workshop and was a painter of genre scenes.

References

 Content was translated from the corresponding article on the Italian Wikipedia

1660 births
1738 deaths
People from Ascoli Piceno
17th-century Italian painters
Italian male painters
18th-century Italian painters
Italian Baroque painters
18th-century Italian male artists